No. 11 Squadron, named the Arrows, is a Pakistan Air Force (PAF) fighter squadron assigned to the No. 39 Multi-Role Wing of the PAF Southern Air Command. It operates the Block 15 MLU model of the F-16 Fighting Falcon with a multi-role tasking and is also an Operational Conversion Unit (OCU).

The squadron crest has an arrow pointing upwards, circled by 11 stars, and symbolises the pursuit of professional excellence.

History

The squadron was first established on 1 January 1949 at RPAF Station Mauripur as a light bomber unit. It was supposed to be equipped with the Bristol Brigand but the first aircraft crashed before arriving in Pakistan. The type's procurement was subsequently halted and the unit was disbanded in February 1949. In June 1951 the unit was restored as a fighter-interceptor squadron and became the PAF's first jet squadron with the introduction of the Supermarine Attacker. First commanded by Squadron Leader A. Rahim Khan, the unit was to remain the PAF's only jet squadron until 18 January 1956 when the unit was re-equipped with the F-86F Sabre and its role changed to a Fighter Bomber squadron.

1965 War 
The squadron took part in the 1965 Indo-Pak War as part of the No. 33 Wing at PAF Base Sargodha (now PAF Base Mushaf). The Arrows flew 227 sorties, including Air Defence and Close Air Support missions, during the 17-day war. Ten Hawker Hunters and three Folland Gnats of the Indian Air Force were shot down during these missions, with a further three Hawker Hunters damaged. One F-86 was shot down in Indian territory during a fighter sweep mission, flown by Flying Officer Shaukat.

1971 War 

When sanctions and an arms embargo was placed on Pakistan by the U.S. after the 1965 war, the Arrows were re-equipped with the Shenyang F-6 in 1966 and their role changed to Air Superiority. The unit moved to PAF Base Rafiqui in January 1971, moving back to Sargodha during the 1971 Indo-Pak War. Again, the squadron flew Air Defence and Close Air Support missions during which a Sukhoi Su-7 and a MiG-21 were shot down. One of the squadron's F-6 fighter was shot down over India. After the war, the squadron returned to PAF Base Rafiqui.
During these wars, the Arrows were credited with the highest number of kills of any PAF squadron.

1982 - 1998 
In January 1983, the unit was again moved to PAF Base Sargodha and became the first squadron to re-equip with the F-16 Fighting Falcon, becoming a Multi-Role unit with the introduction of the F-16A/B Block 15.

The squadron was termed as "exceptional" after an inspection by the Inspectorate team on 28 October 1991. In early 1992 an imminent threat to Pakistani nuclear facilities led to the squadron flying missions under a national contingency plan named Thunderbolt from 19 February 1992. After nuclear tests by India in May 1998, the squadron was deployed on 24 May 1998 to its wartime location at a satellite base to perform day/night Air Defence Alert (ADA) duties until 28 May 1998 when the Pakistani nuclear tests were completed.

2019 Jammu and Kashmir Airstrikes 

The No. 11 Squadron played a vital role during hostilities in 2019 with India. An F-16B Block-20 MLU (S. No. 84606) flown by Squadron Leader Hasan Siddiqui shot down an Indian SU-30MKI from the No. 221 Squadron IAF with an AIM-120 BVR missile.

Aircraft Flown

Gallery

Exercises

National
 Jetstream 1981 – awarded with Professionals Trophy.
 Exercise Hit Hard XII (1990) – Deployed to PAF Base Masroor to take part in the exercise and also completed guided bomb trials at Sonmiani Test Range.
 July 1991 – participated in a DACT Camp with No. 5, 18 and 20 Squadrons.
 High Mark 1993 – 225 kills awarded, 100% mission success rate achieved, 100% accuracy achieved using ATLIS II targeting pod and laser-guided bombs.
 ACES (Air Combat Evaluations) 
 PAF Top Guns 1993
 PAF Top Guns 1994
 PAF Top Guns 1995
 Inter-Squadron Armament Competition (ISAC)
 1996 – held at PAF Base Masroor, 11 squadron achieved 3rd place.

International
 Anatolian Eagle – Participated multiple times. Turkey.
 Al-Saqoor II – An exercise with the Royal Saudi Air Force that was carried out in January 2011. As well as F-16s from the Arrows, the PAF also sent Dassault Mirage 5 fighters as part of the contingent.

See also
List of Pakistan Air Force squadrons
No. 9 Squadron (Pakistan Air Force)
No. 16 Squadron (Pakistan Air Force)
No. 26 Squadron (Pakistan Air Force)

References

Pakistan Air Force squadrons